The Falkland Islands competed at the 2018 Commonwealth Games in the Gold Coast, Australia from 4 April to 15 April 2018. It was the Falkland Islands's 10th appearance at the Commonwealth Games.

The Falkland Islands team consisted of 15 (eleven men and four women) athletes competing in two sports: badminton and shooting. The team also had 11 officials.

Sport shooter Graham Didlick was the island's flag bearer during the opening ceremony.

Competitors
The following is the list of the number of competitors who participated at the Games per sport/discipline.

Badminton

The Falkland Islands participated with five athletes (three men and two women).

Singles

Doubles

Shooting

The Falkland Islands entered ten sport shooters (eight male and two female).

Men

Women

Open

References

Nations at the 2018 Commonwealth Games
Falkland Islands at the Commonwealth Games
2018 in the Falkland Islands